Nøddebo Præstegård may refer to:
 Nøddebo Præstegård (1934 film), a Danish family film Christmas classic
 Nøddebo Præstegård (1974 film), a remake of the above